Willy Schmelcher (25 October 1894 - 15 February 1974) was Nazi politician and SS-Gruppenführer who served as an SS and Police Leader in Ukraine and Wartheland during the Second World War.

Early life
Schmelcher, the son of a master glazier, completed realschule in Eppingen in 1911. Until 1914 he studied at the building trade school in Stuttgart. On the outbreak of the First World War, he joined the Imperial German Army and served on the western front as a combat engineer. Commissioned a Leutnant in July 1917, he was captured by the British in September 1918, earning the Iron Cross, 1st and 2nd class. Released in January 1920, he studied civil engineering at the Stuttgart Technical University, graduating with an engineering degree in 1925. He passed his state engineering examinations in 1927 and worked as a construction engineer.

Nazi Party career
Schmelcher joined the Nazi Party (membership number 90,783) and the SA in June 1928. In 1929 he was elected to the Neustadt city council, serving as the leader of the NSDAP parliamentary group and becoming City Council Chairman. He was also the SA Leader in Gau Baden from 1928 to August 1930. In June 1930 he became a member of the SS and two months later he left the SA with the rank of Standartenführer. Schmelcher in September 1932 became the leader of the 10th SS-Standarde in Kaiserslautern, remaining there until July 1935.

After the Nazi seizure of power, Schmelcher became chairman of the NSDAP parliamentary group in the Rhenish Palatinate District Assembly (Kreistag) in March 1933 and held this office until 1937. In November 1933, he was elected to the Reichstag from electoral constituency 27 (Rheinpfalz) and served until the end of the Nazi regime. From March 1935 to October 1942 he was the Polizeipräsident (chief of police) in Saarbrücken. He held SS staff positions with Abschnitt XXIX in Mannheim and with Oberabschnitte "Südwest" and "Rhein" from 1935 to 1938, before moving to the Reich Security Main Office.

Second World War
In 1940, during the Second World War, Schmelcher performed military service with the 36th Infantry Division. After the fall of France, he was made Police President of Metz in December 1940. Following the German attack on the Soviet Union, Schmelcher became the SS and Police Leader (SSPF) in Tschernigow from 19 November 1941 to 1 July 1943 and also in Shitomir from 5 May to 25 September 1943. From 15 October 1943 to the end of the Nazi regime in May 1945, Schmelcher also served as head of the Technische Nothilfe, a civil defense organization in the main office of the Ordnungspolizei (Order Police). On 9 November 1943, he was promoted to SS- Gruppenführer and Generalleutnant der Polizei. In December 1944 he was made the Higher SS and Police Leader (HSSPF) "Warthe" with his headquarters in Posen.

Postwar
After the end of the war, Schmelcher was interned by the Allies. In January 1949 he underwent denazification and was deemed a "lesser offender." From 1954 to 1962, he worked in the civil defense department of the Saarland Interior Ministry. Schmelcher died in Saarbrücken in February 1974.

External weblink

Sources

1894 births
1974 deaths
German Army officers of World War II
German police chiefs
Holocaust perpetrators in Germany
Holocaust perpetrators in Ukraine
Members of the Reichstag of Nazi Germany
Nazi Party politicians
People from the Grand Duchy of Baden
SS-Gruppenführer
Recipients of the Iron Cross (1914), 1st class
Recipients of the Iron Cross (1914), 2nd class
SS and Police Leaders
Sturmabteilung officers